Lucknow Junction  (officially Lucknow NER, station code: LJN) is one of the two main railway stations of Lucknow city for  broad gauge trains. It is situated right next to Lucknow Charbagh railway station.

See also

Lucknow Charbagh railway station
Aishbagh railway station

References

External links 

 

Railway junction stations in Uttar Pradesh
Railway stations in Lucknow
Lucknow NER railway division